Stefaan is a Dutch-language masculine given name, a version of Stephen, that is most common in Belgium. People with this name include:

Stefaan De Clerck (born 1951), Belgian politician and former Minister of Justice
Stefaan Engels (born 1961), Belgian long-distance runner who ran 365 marathons in one year
Stefaan Maene (born 1972), Belgian swimmer
Stefaan Simons (born c. 1960), British chemical engineer 
Stefaan Tanghe (born 1972), Belgian footballer
Stefaan Van Hecke (born 1973), Belgian  politician
Stefaan Verhulst (born 1966), American technology writer

See also
Stefan, a masculine given name

Dutch masculine given names